The men's individual pursuit at the 1958 British Empire and Commonwealth Games, was part of the cycling programme, which took place in July 1958.

Results

References

Men's individual pursuit
Cycling at the Commonwealth Games – Men's individual pursuit